Andrew Thornley (born 1 March 1989) is an English professional rugby league footballer who plays as a  or  for Whitehaven RLFC in the RFL Championship.

Rugby League

Wigan Warriors
He was contracted to the Wigan Warriors, and spent time on loan from Wigan at the Salford City Reds in the Super League and Whitehaven in the Championship. He has also played Whitehaven and Leigh in the Championship, spending time on loan from Centurions at the Swinton Lions in the second tier and the North Wales Crusaders in League 1. Thornley has also played for Swinton on a permanent deal in the Championship and the third tier. He played as a er earlier in his career.

Whitehaven R.L.F.C.
On 27 Mar 2021 it was reported that he had signed for Whitehaven R.L.F.C. in the RFL Championship

Rugby Union
He has played club level rugby union for Preston Grasshoppers.

References

External links
Swinton Lions profile
St Helens 38-12 Salford
Whitehaven stun leaders Halifax
Championship round-up - week six
Leigh Centurions sign Dean McGilvray & Andrew Thornley

1989 births
Living people
English rugby league players
English rugby union players
Leigh Leopards players
North Wales Crusaders players
Preston Grasshoppers R.F.C. players
Rugby league wingers
Salford Red Devils players
Swinton Lions players
Wigan Warriors players
Whitehaven R.L.F.C. players